World Trade Centre Kuala Lumpur, formerly known as Putra World Trade Centre (PWTC), is a convention and exhibition centre in Kuala Lumpur, Malaysia. The venue is sprawled over 1.70 million square feet with 235,000 square feet of exhibition space.

It is Malaysia's historical convention centre and the preferred venue for local and international conventions, concerts, weddings, including small events like seminar, training, and meetings.

Construction commenced in 1981 and was completed in 1984. The building was officially opened on 26 September 1985. Before the PWTC, the area was the venue of the first and subsequent annual UMNO General Assemblies.

This building is also used for the International Quran Reading Competition every year, since it was moved from Stadium Merdeka in 1985.

Location and access
WTC KL is located in the Chow Kit/Jalan Putra ward in the north-western corner of downtown Kuala Lumpur. It is next to Jalan Putra's interchange with Jalan Tun Ismail and is within walking distance of several hotels such as the Seri Pacific Hotel Kuala Lumpur, Sunway Putra Hotel, Dynasty Hotel Kuala Lumpur, and Sheraton Imperial Hotel Kuala Lumpur. The confluence of the Batu and Gombak Rivers is located right behind the convention centre.

The Sunway Putra Mall is connected to WTC KL by a pedestrian bridge, which also links up the LRT and KTM Komuter stations and the aforementioned hotels.

Public transportation
WTC KL previously lend its name to the  PWTC LRT Station on the Ampang Line and the Sri Petaling Line. It is also connected by a pedestrian bridge across Jalan Kuching to the  Putra Komuter station which serves both the  Seremban Line and Port Klang Line on the KTM Komuter network.

Car
WTC KL is located adjacent to the interchanges with Jalan Kuching and Jalan Ipoh, both part of the Federal Route 1 system.

Interior
Menara Dato Onn - The UMNO general headquarters
Dewan Merdeka
Dewan Tun Dr Ismail
Dewan Tun Hussein Onn
Dewan Tun Razak 1 & 2 (Separated from the main building across Batu river)
Dewan Tun Razak 3
Dewan Tun Razak 4
Johor/Kedah Room
Kuala Lumpur Room
Kenanga Room
Pahang Room
Perak Room
Perlis Room
Perdana Lounge
Tanjung Lounge
Anggerik Lounge
Melur Lounge
Serambi Lounge
Cempaka Suites
Merdeka Suites
Perdana Suites
Seroja Suites

Notable events 
PATA General Conference in 1986.
Commonwealth Heads of Government Meeting 1989.
 ABU Golden Kite World Song Festival, 1989-1991
 Toto, Kingdom of Desire Tour  25 November 1992
 B.B. King, 2 December 1992
 Bryan Adams, 3 January 1994
 Bob Dylan,  Never Ending Tour  22 February 1992
 Duran Duran,  1993-1994 The Dilate Your Mind Tour  8 April 1994
 Bread, 19 September 1997
 Westlife,  Where Dreams Come True Tour  26 May 2001
 NAM General Conference in 2003.
 Bruno Mars, 10 April 2011. 
MATTA Fair
PUBG Mobile Club Open - Fall Split Prelims that was held on 23-25 November 2019
PUBG Mobile Club Open - Fall Split Global Finals that was held on 29 November-1 December 2019
COVID-19 mega vaccination centre (PPV) for Kuala Lumpur region

See also
 Kuala Lumpur Convention Centre

References

External links

WTCKL Official Website
PutraWorldTradeCentre.com
PWTC Events Blog

1985 establishments in Malaysia
Convention centres in Kuala Lumpur
World Trade Centers
United Malays National Organisation